Cannabigerolic acid (CBGA) is the acidic form of cannabigerol (CBG). It is a dihydroxybenzoic acid and olivetolic acid in which the hydrogen at position 3 is substituted by a geranyl group. It is a biosynthetic precursor to Delta-9-tetrahydrocannabinol, which is the principal psychoactive constituent of the Cannabis plant. It is also a diterpenoid, a polyketide, a member of resorcinols and a phytocannabinoid. It derives from an olivetolic acid. It is a conjugate acid of a cannabigerolate.

In the Cannabis plant, olivetolic acid and geranyl diphosphate are synthesized into CBGA. CBGA is converted in the plant by CBCA synthase, CBDA synthase and THCA synthase into CBCA, CBDA and THCA respectively. Afterwards, THCA and CBDA can be decarboxylated into THC and CBD by drying and heating plant material. CBGA has emerging pharmacological properties; for example, it had anticonvulsant effects in a mouse model of Dravet syndrome, a form of epilepsy.

COVID-19 
In an analysis by the University of Rhode Island on phytocannabinoids it was found that CBGA had the 2nd highest 3C-like protease inhibitor activity against COVID-19 out of all the phytocannabinoids tested within that study but not as high as the antiviral drug GC376 (72% CBGA vs 24% CBG vs 100% GC376). 

A 2022 pre-clinical study by researchers from the Oregon State University and Oregon Health & Science University found that CBGA (along with CBDA and THCA) could prevent infection by SARS-CoV-2. They found that CBGA was able to block infection by the reference strain (WA-1/2020), alpha variant (B.1.1.7) and beta variant (B.1.351) at micromolar concentrations (IC50 values 37 µg/ml, 26 µg/ml and 35 µg/ml, respectively).  The results, however, are yet to be replicated in animal models or clinical trials. Out of the cannabinoids studied, CBGA was the only one capable of allosteric binding, in addition to orthosteric binding.

References

Further reading 

 

Cannabinoids
Diterpenes